The Old Curiosity Shop is a 1984 Australian animated film based on the 1841 novel by Charles Dickens about a young girl (Nell) who lives with her grandfather in a shop, and what happens after they are evicted from the shop by Quilp, a moneylender. It was made by Burbank Films who produced a number of animated films based on classic novels. Their slate cost an estimated $11 million. The Dickens films sold to 20th Century Fox in the US and to the Seven Network in Australia.

Cast
John Benton
Jason Blackwell
Wallas Eaton
Penne Hackforth-Jones
Brian Harrison
Doreen Harrop
Ross Higgins
Sophie Horton
Jennifer Mellet

References

External links

The Old Curiosity Shop at Letterbox DVD

Australian animated feature films
1984 films
Films based on The Old Curiosity Shop
GoodTimes Entertainment
Animated films based on novels
1980s Australian animated films
1980s English-language films
1980s Australian films